This is a list of the governors of the Mexican state of Guanajuato since 1917.

See also
List of Mexican state governors

References
Governors at guanajuato.gob.mx Accessed April 23, 2005.

Guanajuato